Rissoinidae is a large family of very small and minute sea snails with an operculum, marine gastropod mollusks, in the clade Littorinimorpha. Several genera that were previously part of Rissoinidae have been assigned to the Zebinidae family.

Genera
Genera within the family Rissoinidae include:
 Ailinzebina Ladd, 1966
 Anteglosia H.E. Vokes, 1948†
 Apataxia Laseron, 1956
 Bralitzia Gründel, 1998†
 Buvignieria Cossmann, 1921†
 Chiliostigma Melvill, 1918
 Hudlestoniella Cossmann, 1909†
 Lamellirissoina Kuroda & Habe, 1991
 Leaella Cossmann, 1921†
 Moerchiella G. Nevill, 1885
 Ottoina Harris & Palmer, 1947†
 Parazebinella Boettger, 1893
 Phosinella Mörch, 1876
 Rissoina d'Orbigny, 1840
 Rissoinella Oyama in Taki & Oyama, 1954
 Sulcorissoina Kosuge, 1965
 Zebinella Mörch, 1876
 Zebinostoma Conti & Fischer, 1982†

Genera brought into synonymy
 Austrosina Laseron, 1956: synonym of Rissoina d'Orbigny, 1840
 Caporista Iredale, 1955: synonym of Rissoina d'Orbigny, 1840
 Condylicia Laseron, 1956: synonym of Rissoina d'Orbigny, 1840
 Costalynia Laseron, 1956: synonym of Rissoina (Rissolina) Gould, 1861 represented as Rissoina d'Orbigny, 1840
 Dentrissoina Laseron, 1956: synonym of Tomlinella Viader, 1938
 Fractoralla Laseron, 1956: synonym of Rissoina (Rissolina) Gould, 1861 represented as Rissoina d'Orbigny, 1840
 Laseronia Cotton, 1959: synonym of Rissoina d'Orbigny, 1840
 Peripetella Laseron, 1956: synonym of Rissoina d'Orbigny, 1840
 Phintorene Iredale, 1955: synonym of Phosinella Mörch, 1876
 Planapexia Laseron, 1956: synonym of Phosinella Mörch, 1876
 Pleneconea Laseron, 1956: synonym of Rissoina d'Orbigny, 1840
 Rissolina Gould, 1861: synonym of Rissoina (Rissolina) Gould, 1861 represented as Rissoina d'Orbigny, 1840
 Stiva Hedley, 1904: synonym of Rissoina d'Orbigny, 1840
 Zymalata Laseron, 1956: synonym of Rissoina d'Orbigny, 1840

References

 Ponder W. F. (1985) A review of the genera of the Rissoidae (Mollusca: Mesogastropoda: Rissoacea). Records of the Australian Museum supplement 4: 1-221
 Sleurs W.J.M. (1993). A revision of the Recent species of Rissoina (Moerchiella), R. (Apataxia), R. (Ailinzebina) and R. (Pachyrissoina) (Gastropoda: Rissoidae). Bulletin de l'Institut Royal des Sciences Naturelles de Belgique, 63: 71-135
  Criscione F. & Ponder W.F. (2013) A phylogenetic analysis of rissooidean and cingulopsoidean families (Gastropoda: Caenogastropoda). Molecular Phylogenetics and Evolution 66: 1075–1082